Ichimura (written:  lit. "one village",  lit. "market village" or ) is a Japanese surname. Notable people with the surname include:

, Japanese footballer
, Japanese speed skater
, Japanese politician
, Japanese actor and singer
, Japanese alpine skier
, Japanese voice actor
Takanori Ichimura (born 1979), Japanese curler
, Japanese photographer
, Japanese page and member of the Shinsengumi
Toshikazu Ichimura (born 1941), Japanese aikidoka
, Japanese kabuki theater owner

See also
, a former kabuki theater in Edo, Japan
23628 Ichimura, a main-belt minor planet
Ichimura at Brushstroke, a Japanese restaurant located in New York City

Japanese-language surnames